Indian people with the surname Sarbadhikari belong to a single and unique family whose recorded genealogy goes back to more than 1000 years. Presently Generation 30 is existing. Some of the illustrious descendants include:
 Nagendra Prasad Sarbadhikari, who introduced football in India
 Sir Deva Prasad Sarbadhikari, Vice Chancellor of Calcutta University 1914–1918, educationist, solicitor, author of "Smritirekha", first Indian Vice-President of the Rotary Club of Calcutta
 Lt. Col. Dr. Suresh Prasad Sarbadhikari, surgeon
Berry Sarbadhikari, cricket commentator
Dr Kanak Chandra Sarbadhikari, Principal of Medical College, Bengal; Director of Health Services, Government of West Bengal and District Governor of Rotary  
Prof. Haimanti Sarbadhikari ,  mathematician at the Indian Statistical Institute  
Prof. Suptendra Nath Sarbadhikari 
Prof. Pradip Sarbadhikari 
Prof. P C Sarbadhikari 
S Basu Sarbadhikari

See also
Indian family name 
List of most popular family names#India

References

External links
 Database
 Sarbadhikari at Pubmed

Bengal
Bengali people
Indian surnames